

1877–1917

The format is: Name, launch year, place of construction (if foreign), commissioning fleet (BF = Baltic Fleet, BSF = Black Sea Fleet, CF = Caspian Flotilla, SF = Siberian Flotilla, POF = Pacific Ocean Fleet), fate = BU.

Note on official classification. First small ships with a mine or torpedo — (pole mines or Whitehead torpedoes) — appeared in the Russian Navy in 1877 during the Russo-Turkish War (1877–1878). They were classified "minnyi kater", "минный катер" ("mine/torpedo launch"). One large seagoing ship, the Vzryv ("Взрыв", 1877, 160 tons) with torpedo armament was originally called "minnoye sudno", "минное судно" ("mine/torpedo vessel"). A large series of 133 20-30-ton ships followed in 1878; they were classified "minonoska", "minonosnaya lodka", "миноноска" (literally, "mine/torpedo boat"). It usually translates as "torpedo boat, 2nd class". Then came torpedo ships, which Russia had built or bought since 1880 and classified as "minonosets", "миноносец" (literally, "mine/torpedo carrier"). This designation includes relatively large ships. It therefore translates into English as either "torpedo boat 1st class" or "destroyer" depending on a displacement of more or less than 200 tons. Starting in 1907 and still used today, all sufficiently large torpedo armed ships are classified as EM (ЭМ), "eskadrennyi minonosets", "эскадренный миноносец" (literally, "squadron torpedo carrier"), which usually translates as "destroyer".

Main list

Sokol class (240–300 tons), 27 ships

Russia was the second nation, after Great Britain, to build torpedo boat destroyers (TBDs), basing their first ones upon the Yarrow design.  Sokol, which was built for Russia by Britain's Yarrow Shipbuilders, was laid down in 1894 and completed in January 1895; she was 190 feet long, displaced 220 tons, and attained a speed of over 30 knots during her trials. Sokol was followed by 26 similar TBDs built in Russian yards between 1896 and 1903. This first series of 'classic'  ships were originally organized as torpedo boats ("minonosets"), then were later reclassified as destroyers ("eskadrennyi minonosets") in 1907. Pacific destroyers were built in Saint Petersburg, transported in sections by railway to Port Arthur and assembled. They subsequently participated in the Russo-Japanese War of 1904–1905; those that had escaped from Port Arthur later served in the Siberian Flotilla. Baltic destroyers participated in World War I, the Russian Civil War (1917–1923) and the Finnish Civil War (1918) as minesweepers and avisos. Black Sea destroyers also participated in World War I and the Russian Civil War.

During the Russo-Japanese War (1904–1905), Imperial Russian Navy destroyers were armed with 15-inch torpedoes and one 75 mm gun, as well as several 3-pounder QF guns. Combat experience during that war resulted in the Imperial Russian Navy switching to 18-inch torpedoes and two 75 mm guns for their destroyers after the war.
  ("Сокол") launched 1895, Yarrow, London. Baltic Fleet. – Renamed Prytkiy ("Прыткий") in 1902; she was fitted as a minesweeper in 1915, transferred to the Volga River and the Caspian Sea in 1918–1919, and broken up (BU) in 1922.
 Yastreb ("Ястреб", 1898, BF) – Prochnyi ("Прочный") 1902; she was reclassified as a minesweeper 1913, transferred to the Volga and the Caspian in 1918, BU in 1922
 Korshun ("Коршун") launched 1898 Crichton, Turku. Baltic Fleet. Poslushnyi ("Послушный") 1902; reclassified as a minesweeper in 1913, BU in 1922
 Nyrok ("Нырок", 1898, BF) – Porazhayushchiy ("Поражающий"), an aviso in 1913; she was transferred to the Volga and the Caspian Sea in 1918, BU in 1925
 Voron ("Ворон", 1899, BF) – Rezvyi ("Резвый") 1902, reclassified as a minesweeper in 1913, BU in 1922
 Gagara ("Гагара", 1899, BF) – Prozorlivyi ("Прозорливый") 1902, reclassified as a minesweeper in 1913, delivered to the Finnish Red Army in 1918; she served in Finland and was wrecked in 1925
 Filin ("Филин", 1900, BF) – Retivyi ("Ретивый") 1902; she was reclassified as a minesweeper in 1913, transferred to the Volga and the Caspian Sea in 1918 and BU in 1922
 Sova ("Сова", 1900, BF) – Ryanyi ("Рьяный") 1902, reclassified as a minesweeper in 1913, delivered to the Finnish Red Army in 1918, served as a patrol ship and target vessel in Finland, BU in 1939
 Albatros ("Альбатрос", 1901, BF) – Podvizhnyi ("Подвижный") 1902, delivered to the Finnish Red Army in 1918, served in Finland; she was decommissioned in 1939 (she was preserved until 1943)
 Berkut ("Беркут", 1898, CF) – Pronzitel‘nyi ("Пронзительный") 1902, decommissioned in 1911
 Krechet ("Кречет") launched 1898 Crichton, Turku., CF – Pylkiy ("Прыткий") 1902, hulked in 1911
 Lebed‘ ("Лебедь", 1901, BSF) – became Strogiy ("Строгий") in 1902 and the Marti ("Марти") 1922, BU in 1929
 Pelikan ("Пеликан", 1901, BSF) – Smetlivyi ("Сметливый") 1902, scuttled to avoid capture at Tsemes Bay on 18 June 1918
 Pavlin ("Павлин", 1901, BSF) – became Svirepyi ("Свирепый") in 1902, the destroyer № 204 in 1918, Svirepyi ("Свирепый") in 1919 and Leitenant Schmidt ("Лейтенант Шмидт") in 1922, BU in 1927
 Fazan ("Фазан", 1901, BSF) – Stremitel‘nyi ("Стремительный") in 1902; she was scuttled to avoid capture at Tsemes Bay on 18 June 1918
 Kondor ("Кондор"), ex-Baklan ("Баклан", 1901, POF) – Reshitel‘nyi ("Решительный") 1902, captured by Japan in Chefoo (China) in 1904, renamed Akatsuki in 1905, participated in the Battle of Tsushima where she collided with a Japanese torpedo boat which sank, renamed Yamabiko in 1906; she was decommissioned in 1917
 Bekas ("Бекас", 1901, POF) – Serdityi ("Сердитый") 1902, BU in 1923
 Smelyi ("Смелый"), ex-Gorlitsa ("Горлица") (1902, POF) – BU in 1923
 Skoryi ("Скорый"), ex-Perepel ("Перепел") (1903, POF) – BU in 1923
 Statnyi ("Статный"), ex-Shchegol ("Щегол") (1903, POF) – BU in 1923
 Steregushchiy ("Стерегущий"), ex-Kulik ("Кулик") (1903, POF) – sunk in battle in 1904 (49 men were lost)
 Strashnyi ("Страшный", ex-Skvorets ("Скворец") (1903, POF) – On 13 April 1904 while returning from patrol, and attempting to re-enter Port Arthur, Strashnyi was suddenly engaged by Imperial Japanese Navy (IJN) torpedo boat destroyers, and was sunk during the surface engagement; 59 crewmen were lost.
 Storozhevoy ("Сторожевой"), ex-Grach ("Грач") (1903, POF) – struck a mine and was scuttled in 1904
 Sil‘nyi ("Сильный"), ex-Baklan ("Баклан"), ex Kondor ("Кондор") (1903, POF) – After successfully sinking the IJN block ship (aka fireship) Chiyo Maru with a torpedo, she duelled with IJN torpedo boat destroyers shortly afterwards, and was driven onto a sandbank on 27 March 1904.  She was subsequently refloated by Japan in 1905, renamed Fumizuki; she was decommissioned in 1913
 Stroynyi ("Стройный"), ex-Strizh ("Стриж") (1903, POF) – struck a mine in 1904 (2 men lost)
 Razyashchiy ("Разящий"), ex-Drozd ("Дрозд") (1903, POF) – struck a mine and was scuttled in 1904
 Rastoropnyi ("Расторопный"), ex-Diatel ("Дятел") (1903, POF) – scuttled in 1904

Hǎi Lóng (海龙) class (ex-Chinese) (312 tons), 1 ship
 Leitenant Burakov (1898, Elbing (German Empire, now in modern northern Poland), ex-Chinese Hǎi Huā — 海華) – captured at the Taku Forts during the Boxer Rebellion (17 June 1900), renamed Taku ("Таку"), in 1901 – Leitenant Burakov ("Лейтенант Бураков"); she was the fastest Russian torpedo boat (33.6 kn) during the siege of Port Arthur; she served as an aviso. Badly damaged by a Japanese torpedo launch, she was scuttled by her crew in 1904.

Kit class (350 tons), 4 ships

Torpedo boats participated in the Russo-Japanese War of 1904–1905. Three of them later served in the Siberian Flotilla; they were reclassified as destroyers in 1907
 Kit ("Кит", 1899, Elbing POF) – Renamed Bditel‘nyi ("Бдительный") 1902; she struck a mine and was scuttled in 1904
 Del‘fin ("Дельфин", 1899, Elbing, POF) – Besstrashnyi ("Бесстрашный") 1902; she was transferred to the Arctic Sea Flotilla in 1917 and BU in 1924
 Skat ("Скат", 1899, Elbing, POF) – Besposhchadnyi ("Беспощадный") 1902, BU in 1923
 Kasatka ("Касатка", 1900, Elbing, POF) – Besshumnyi ("Бесшумный") 1902, transferred to the Arctic Sea Flotilla in 1917, BU in 1924

Forel class (312/346 tons), 5 ships

Officially classified as torpedo boats, they participated in the Russo-Japanese War. Two later served in the Siberian and Arctic Flotillas.
 Forel ("Форель", 1900, Le Havre, POF) – Renamed Vnimatelnyi ("Внимательный") 1902, wrecked in 1904
 Sterliad‘ ("Стерлядь", 1901, Le Havre, POF) – Vynoslivyi ("Выносливый") 1902, struck a mine in 1904 (12 men lost)
 Osiotr ("Осётр", 1901, Le Havre, POF) – Vnushitelnyi ("Внушительный") 1902, scuttled in 1904
 Kefal ("Кефаль", 1901, Le Havre, POF) – Vlastnyi ("Властный") 1902, transferred to the Arctic Sea Flotilla 1917, BU in 1921
 Losos ("Лосось", 1902, Le Havre, POF) – Grozovoi ("Грозовой") 1902, transferred to the Arctic Sea Flotilla 1917, BU in 1923–24

Som-class torpedo boat (350 tons), 1 ship
 Som ("Сом", 1899, Birkenhead, POF)  – Boevoy ("Боевой") since 1902, sunk by Japanese torpedo destroyer in 1904

Buinyi class (350/450 tons), 10 ships

Two Pacific ships participated in the defence of Port Arthur in 1904; those destined for the Baltic (except for the uncompleted Vidnyi) were sent to the Far East and fought in the Battle of Tsushima (1905). The survivors were reclassified as destroyers in 1907. Originally named after various aquatic animals and fish, the Buinyi class were named after various "active" characteristics at the time of Tsushima, with all but one beginning with the Russian letter Б.
 Buinyi ("Буйный", "Wild" or "Exuberant"), ex-Bychiok ("Бычёк", "Goby") (1901, BF) – scuttled in 1905
 Boikiy ("Бойкий", "Jaunty"), ex-Akula ("Акула", "Shark") (1901, POF) – after the war she served with the Siberian Flotilla, BU in 1925
 Burnyi ("Бурный", "Stormy"), ex-Makrel‘ ("Макрель", "Mackerel") (1901, POF) – wrecked and scuttled in 1904
 Bystryi ("Быстрый", "Fast"), ex-Plotva ("Плотва", "Roach") (1901, BF) – scuttled in 1905
 Bravyi ("Бравый", "Gallant" or "Dashing"), ex-Nalim ("Налим", "Burbot") (1901, BF) – after the war she served in the Siberian Flotilla; she was renamed the Anisimov ("Анисимов") in 1923, BU in 1925
 Blestyashchiy ("Блестящий", "Brilliant"), ex-Okun‘ ("Окунь", "Perch") (1901, BF) – scuttled in 1905 (6 men lost)
 Bedovyi ("Бедовый", "Daring" or "Reckless"), ex-Keta ("Кета", "Chum") (1902, BF) – captured by Japan with the Commander-in-Chief of the Russian squadron, Admiral Zinovy Rozhestvensky in 1905; she was renamed the Satsuki and BU in 1922
 Bodryi ("Бодрый", "Bouncy" or "Cheerful"), ex-Peskar‘ ("Пескарь", "Gudgeon") (1902, BF) – after the war she served with the Siberian Flotilla, BU in 1925
 Bezuprechnyi ("Безупречный", "Irreproachable" or "Perfect"), ex-Paltus ("Палтус", "Halibut") (1902, BF) – sunk in battle in 1905 (73 men lost)
 Vidnyi ("Видный", "Prominent"), ex-Sig ("Сиг", "Whitefish") (1904, BF) – BU in 1925

Groznyi class / Project of 1903 (420 tons), 3 ships

Originally classified as torpedo boats. The first two were sent to the Far East and took part in the Battle of Tsushima in 1905.
 Groznyi ("Грозный", 1904, BF) – after the war she served in the Siberian Flotilla; she was classified as a destroyer in 1907, BU in 1925
 Gromkiy ("Громкий", 1904, BF) – sunk in battle in 1905 (23 men lost)
 Gromiashchiy ("Громящий", 1904, BF) – classified as a destroyer in 1907, BU in 1925

Leitenant Pushchin class / "Z" and "Zh" class (350/440 tons), 9 ships

Classified as destroyers in 1907. Participated in World War I and the Russian Civil War.
 Zavetnyi ("Заветный"), ex-Karp ("Карп") (1903, BSF) – captured by Germany in 1918, scuttled by her crew in 1919
 Zavidnyi ("Завидный"), ex-Beluga ("Белуга") (1903, BSF) – captured by Germany in 1918 (renamed R 13), destroyed by British troops in 1919
 Zhivoy ("Живой"), ex-Rybets ("Рыбец") (1903, BSF) – captured by Germany in 1918 (R 14), captured by Britain and delivered to the White Army in 1918–19, renamed the Zhivoy ("Живой"), wrecked in 1920 (250 men lost: crew and evacuees)
 Zhutkiy ("Жуткий", ex-Ugor‘ ("Угорь") (1904, BSF) – captured by Germany in 1918 (R 12), destroyed by British troops in 1919
 Zharkiy ("Жаркий"), ex-Shchuka ("Щука") (1904, BSF) – captured by Germany in 1918, captured by Britain and delivered to the White Army in 1919, interned by France in Bizerte in 1920, returned to Soviet Russia and BU in 1924
 Zhivuchiy ("Живучий"), ex-Karas‘ ("Карась") (1904, BSF) – struck a mine in 1916 (48 men lost)
 Leitenant Pushchin ("Лейтенант Пущин"), ex-Zadornyi ("Задорный") (1904, BSF) – struck a mine in 1916 (56 men lost)
 Zvonkiy ("Звонкий") (1904, BSF) – captured by Germany 1918 (R 11), captured by Britain and delivered to Greece (Doxa) in 1918, delivered to the White Army in 1919, renamed Zvonkiy ("Звонкий"), interned by France in Bizerte in 1920, returned to Soviet Russia and BU after 1924
 Zorkiy ("Зоркий", 1904, BSF) – captured by Germany in 1918 (R 10), captured by Britain and delivered to Italy in 1918, delivered to the White Army in 1919, renamed Zorkiy ("Зоркий"), interned by France in Bizerte in 1920, returned to Soviet Russia and BU after 1924

Leitenant Burakov class (237/320 tons), 11 ships

After completion all ships were reclassified as destroyers; they participated in World War I in the Baltic Sea for patrol, cruiser and minelaying purposes. Some units participated in the Russian Civil War.
 Leitenant Burakov ("Лейтенант Бураков", 1905, Le Havre, BF) – aviso 1912, struck a mine in 1917 (23 men lost)
 Metkiy ("Меткий", 1905, Le Havre, BF) – BU in 1922
 Molodetskiy ("Молодецкий", 1905, Le Havre, BF) – BU in 1923
 Moshchnyi ("Мощный", 1905, Le Havre, BF) – BU in 1926
 Iskusnyi ("Искусный", 1905, La Seyne, BF) – BU in 1924
 Ispolnitelnyi ("Исполнительный", 1905, La Seyne, BF) – wrecked in 1914 and found in 2014 (130 men lost)
 Krepkiy ("Крепкий", 1905, La Seyne, BF) – training destroyer Roshal ("Рошаль") in 1922, BU in 1924
 Liogkiy ("Лёгкий", 1905, La Seyne, BF) – training vessel in 1920, BU in 1924
 Lovkiy ("Ловкий", 1905, Le Havre, BF) – BU in 1925
 Letuchiy ("Летучий", 1905, Le Havre, BF) – wrecked in 1914 (65 men lost)
 Likhoy ("Лихой", 1905, Le Havre, BF) – BU in 1922

Tverdyi-class torpedo boats (300–310 tons), 5 ships
They were built in Saint Petersburg, transported in pieces by railway to Vladivostok, launched and commissioned
 Tviordyi ("Твёрдый", 1906, SF) – Renamed Lazo ("Лазо") 1923, BU in 1927
 Tochnyi ("Точный", 1906, SF) – Renamed Potapenko ("Потапенко") 1923, BU in 1927
 Trevozhnyi ("Тревожный", 1906, SF) – BU in 1923
 Inzhener-mekhanik Anastasov ("Инженер-механик Анастасов", 1907, SF) – BU in 1923
 Leitenant Maleev ("Лейтенант Малеев", 1907, SF) – BU in 1923

Kapitan Yurasovskiy class (450 tons), 10 ships
Classified as torpedo boats until 1907. A pair of Siberian destroyers were built in Germany, delivered to Vladivostok in parts and launched
 Kapitan Yurasovskiy ("Капитан Юрасовский" in 1907, Elbing, SF) – transferred to the Arctic Sea Flotilla in 1917, BU in 1924
 Leitenant Sergeev ("Лейтенант Сергеев" in 1907, Elbing, SF) – transferred to the Arctic Sea Flotilla in 1917, BU in 1924
 Inzhener-mekhanik Zverev ("Инженер-механик Зверев" in 1906, Elbing, BF) – minesweeper in 1922, Zhemchuzhin ("Жемчужин") in 1925, BU in 1930
 Inzhener-mekhanik Dmitriev ("Инженер-механик Дмитриев", in 1905, Elbing, BF) – minesweeper in 1922, Roshal‘ ("Рошаль") in 1925, BU in 1929
 Bditelnyi ("Бдительный", 1906, Elbing, BF) – struck a mine in 1917 (60 men lost)
 Boevoi ("Боевой" in 1905, Elbing, BF) – BU in 1925
 Burnyi ("Бурный" in 1906, Elbing, BF) – BU in 1925
 Vnimatelnyi ("Внимательный" in 1906, Elbing, BF) – minesweeper in 1921, BU in 1925
 Vynoslivyi ("Выносливый" in 1906, Elbing, BF) – minesweeper in 1921, Artemyev ("Артемьев") 1925, decommissioned 1932, BU in 1953
 Vnushitelnyi ("Внуштельный" in 1906, Elbing, BF) – minesweeper in 1921, Martynov ("Мартынов") 1925, BU in 1940

Deyatelnyi class / Project of 1904 (382 tons), 8 ships

The last series of Havock-class torpedo boat destroyers. They participated in World War I in the Baltic Sea and in the Russian Civil War (1917–1923) on that country's rivers and lakes.
 Sil‘nyi ("Сильный", 1905, BF) – BU in 1924
 Storozhevoy ("Сторожевой", 1906, BF) – transferred to Lake Onega and the Caspian Sea in 1919, BU in 1925
 Stroinyi ("Стройный", 1906, BF) – sunk by a bomb in 1917
 Razyashchiy ("Разящий", 1906, BF) – BU in 1924
 Rastoropnyi ("Расторопный", 1907, BF) – transferred to the Caspian Sea in 1918, BU in 1925
 Del‘nyi ("Дельный", 1907, BF) – transferred to the Caspian Sea in 1918, BU in 1922
 Deyatel‘nyi ("Деятельный", 1907, BF) – transferred to the Caspian Sea in 1918, BU in 1925
 Dostoinyi ("Достойный", 1907, BF) – transferred to Lake Onega and the Caspian Sea in 1919, BU in 1925

Finn class / Project Letter "Sh" (Schichau) (570/650 tons), 4 ships

They were until 1907, classified as 'torpedo cruisers' and built with public donations, then named after the most lavish donors. They participated in World War I in the Baltic Sea and in the Russian Civil War on that country's rivers and lakes.
 Emir Bukharskiy ("Эмир Бухарский", 1904, BF) – transferred to Lake Ladoga and the Caspian Sea in 1918, renamed Yakov Sverdlov ("Яков Свердлов") in 1919, BU in 1925
 Finn ("Финн", 1905, BF) – transferred to the Caspian Sea in 1918, renamed Karl Liebknecht ("Карл Либкнехт") in 1919, BU in 1925
 Moskvityanin ("Москвитянин", 1905, BF) – transferred to the Caspian Sea in 1918, sunk in a battle with a British flotilla in 1919
 Dobrovolets ("Доброволец", 1905, BF) – struck a mine in 1916 (37 men lost)

Vsadnik class (570/750 tons), 4 ships

Classified as 'torpedo cruisers' until 1907. Participated in World War I in the Baltic Sea and in the Russian Civil War on that country's lakes.
 Vsadnik ("Всадник", 1905, Kiel, BF) – renamed Sladkov ("Сладков") 1922, BU in 1928
 Gaidamak ("Гайдамак", 1905, Kiel, BF) – BU in 1927
 Amurets ("Амурец", 1905, Kiel, BF) – Zhelezniakov ("Железняков") 1922, aviso in 1926, hulked in 1938
 Ussuriets ("Уссуриец", 1907, Kiel, BF) – Roshal‘ ("Рошаль") 1922, wrecked in 1924

Okhotnik class (615/750 tons), 4 ships

Classified as 'torpedo cruisers' until 1907. Actively participated in World War I in the Baltic Sea and the Russian Civil War on that country's lakes. Designed with an unusually long hull to increase the number of guns and torpedo launchers that could be fitted, far in excess of most destroyers of the time.
 General Kondratenko ("Генерал Кондратенко", 1905, BF) – BU 1924
 Sibirskiy strelok ("Сибирский стрелок", 1905, BF) – reclassified as a test ship in 1921, renamed Konstruktor ("Конструктор") in 1926, a corvette (patrol ship) in 1941, combat service on Lake Ladoga in 1941–1944 during World War II, sunk by Finnish aircraft in 1941 (200 men lost: crew and evacuees), raised and repaired as a gunboat in 1943, test ship 1945, BU in 1957
 Okhotnik ("Охотник", 1906, BF) – struck a mine in 1917 (52 men lost)
 Pogranichnik ("Пограничник" 1906, BF) – BU in 1924

Ukrayna class / Project Letter "V" (Vulcan) (630–730 tons), 8 ships

Built with public donations and named after the most lavish donors, they were classified as 'torpedo cruisers' until 1907. They participated in World War I and in the Russian Civil War on the Baltic and Caspian Seas.
 Ukrayna ("Украйна", 1904, BF) – transferred to the Caspian Sea in 1919; she was renamed Karl Marx ("Карл Маркс") in 1920, Ukrayna ("Украйна") in 1920, Markin ("Маркин") in 1922, Ukrayna ("Украйна") in 1923 and Bakinskiy Rabochiy ("Бакинский рабочий") in 1924. She was a gunboat in 1926, a training ship in 1949 and sunk as a target vessel in 1961
 Voiskovoy ("Войсковой", 1904, BF) – transferred to the Caspian Sea in 1919; she was renamed Friedrich Engels ("Фридрих Энгельс") in 1920, Voiskovoy ("Войсковой") in 1920 and Markin ("Маркин") in 1923. She became a gunboat in 1926, a training ship in 1949 and was BU in 1958
 Trukhmenets ("Трухменец", 1905, BF) – Turkmenets-Stavropol‘skiy ("Туркменец-Ставропольский") 1908; she was transferred to the Caspian Sea in 1919, renamed Mirza Kuchak ("Мирза Кучук") in 1920, Turkmenets-Stavropol'skiy ("Туркменец-Ставропольский") also in 1920, Altfater ("Альтфатер") in 1922 and Sovetskiy Dagestan ("Советский Дагестан") in 1945. She was classified as a gunboat in 1926, a training ship in 1949 and was BU in 1962
 Kazanets ("Казанец", 1905, BF) – torpedoed by a German submarine in 1916 (45 men lost)
 Steregushchiy ("Стерегущий", 1905, BF) – BU in 1924
 Strashnyi ("Страшный", 1905, BF) – BU in 1924
 Donskoy Kazak ("Донской казак", 1906, BF) – BU in 1924
 Zabaykalets ("Забайкалец", 1906, BF) – BU in 1923

Leitenant Shestakov class (635 tons), 4 ships

During their construction they were classified as 'torpedo cruisers'. They actively participated in World War I and in the Russian Civil War in the Black Sea. Distinguishing features of this series were the 120 mm guns.
  ("Лейтенант Шестаков", 1907, BSF) – scuttled in Tsemes Bay to avoid capture on 18 June 1918
 Kapitan Saken ("Капитан Сакен"), ex-Leitenant Pushchin ("Лейтенант Пущин") (1907, BSF) – captured by Germany in 1918 (renamed R 04), then captured by France (R 2), delivered to the White Army in 1919 and renamed Kapitan Saken ("Капитан Сакен"), interned by France in Bizerte in 1920, returned to Soviet Russia and BU after 1924
 Kapitan-leitenant Baranov ("Капитан-лейтенант Баранов", 1907, BSF) – scuttled in Tsemes Bay to avoid capture on 18 June 1918
  ("Лейтенант Зацарённый", 1907, BSF) – struck a mine in 1917 (37 men lost)

(1,260–1,620 tons), 49 ships

A large series of slightly differing destroyers, which took an active part in World War I. Some were completed in postrevolutionary Russia by using parts from other ships. The Baltic destroyers mostly waited through the Revolution and the Russian Civil War in Kronstadt. Later reconditioned, they took part and were lost in World War II. Black Sea ships mostly shared the fate of the Russian Black Sea Fleet of 1918–1920.
 Novik subclass (1,280 tons)
  ("Новик", 1911, BF) – fastest warship in the world at the time of completion (37.3 kn.), renamed Yakov Sverdlov ("Яков Свердлов") in 1926, struck a mine in 1941

  (1,180/1,405 tons), 4 ships
 Bespokoiny ("Беспокойный", 1913, BSF) – captured by Germany in 1918, captured by France (renamed R 1), delivered to the White Army in 1919 and renamed Bespokoiny ("Беспокойный"). She was interned by France in Bizerte in 1920; she returned to Soviet Russia and was BU in 1933
 Gnevnyi (1913, BSF) – she was captured by Germany in 1918 (R 03). Captured by Britain, she was delivered to the White Army in 1919, interned by France in Bizerte in 1920; she was returned to Soviet Russia and BU in 1930
 Derzkiy ("Дерзкий", 1914, BSF) – captured by Germany in 1918; she was also captured by Britain, delivered to the White Army in 1919 and interned by France in Bizerte in 1920. She returned to Soviet Russia and was BU in 1933
 Pronzitelnyi ("Пронзительный", 1914, BSF) – was scuttled in Tsemes Bay to prevent capture on 18 June 1918
 Shchastlivyi/Novik subclass (1,110/1,460 tons), 5 ships
 Gromkiy ("Громкий", 1913, BSF) – she was scuttled in Tsemes Bay to prevent capture on 18 June 1918
 Pospeshnyi ("Поспешный", 1914, BSF) – captured by Germany in 1918, captured by Britain; she was delivered to the White Army in 1919 and interned by France in Bizerte in 1920. She returned to Soviet Russia and was BU after 1924
 Shchastlivyi ("Счастливый", 1914, BSF) – captured by Germany in 1918 (renamed R 01), captured by Britain; she was wrecked in 1919

 Bystryi ("Быстрый", 1914, BSF) – in 1918–20, being under repair, she passed from hand to hand until the Red Army took possession. Repaired and renamed Frunze ("Фрунзе") in 1925, she was sunk by German aircraft in 1941
 Pylkiy ("Пылкий", 1914, BSF) – captured by Germany 1918, delivered to the White Army by the British in 1919; she was interned by France in Bizerte in 1920. She returned to Soviet Russia and was BU in 1933
  (1,260 tons), 8 ships
 Pobeditel''' ("Победитель", 1914, BF) – renamed Volodarskiy ("Володарский") 1922, struck a mine in 1941 (c.140 men lost)
 Zabiyaka ("Забияка", 1914, BF) – renamed Uritskiy ("Урицкий") in 1922; she was transferred to the Northern Fleet in 1933. Refitted as the training vessel Reut ("Реут") in 1951; she was sunk as a target ship in 1958
 Grom ("Гром", 1915, BF) – sunk in battle, 13 October 1917
 Orfey ("Орфей", 1915, BF) – damaged by mine in 1917, BU in 1931
 Letun ("Летун", 1915, BF) – damaged by mine in 1916, BU in 1927
 Desna ("Десна", 1915, BF) – renamed Engels ("Энгельс") in 1922; she struck a mine in 1941
  ("Азард", 1916, BF) – renamed Zinovyev "Зиновьев") in 1922 and Artiom ("Артём") in 1928; she struck a mine in 1941
 Samson ("Самсон", 1916, BF) – renamed Stalin ("Сталин") 1922; she was transferred to the Pacific Ocean Fleet in 1936, refitted to the training vessel Samson ("Самсон") 1946, hulked as a floating barracks 1951 and BU in 1956
 Gavriil/Novik subclass (1,260 tons), 14 ships
 Leitenant Ilyin ("Лейтенант Ильин", 1914, BF) – renamed Garibaldi ("Гарибальди") in 1919, Trotsky ("Троцкий") in 1922 and Voikov ("Войков") in 1928. She was transferred to the Pacific Ocean Fleet in 1936; she became a training ship in 1949 and was BU in 1956
 Kapitan Izylmetyev ("Капитан Изыльметьев" in 1914, BF) – renamed Lenin ("Ленин") in 1922; she was scuttled to prevent capture whilst under repair at Liepāja in 1941
  ("Гавриил". 1915, BF) – struck a mine in 1919
 Kapitan Belli ("Капитан Белли" 1915, completed in 1928, BF) – renamed Karl Liebknecht ("Карл Либкнехт") in 1922; she was transferred to the Northern Fleet in 1933 and hulked in 1955
 Kapitan 1 ranga Miklukho-Maklay ("Капитан 1 ранга Миклухо-Маклай"), ex-Kapitan Kingsbergen ("Капитан Кингсберген") (1915, BF) – renamed Spartak ("Спартак") in 1918, captured by the British in 1918 in Tallinn and under the name Vambola; she was delivered to the Estonian Navy and sold on to Peru in 1933, where she was named Almirante Villar and BU in 1955
 Kapitan Kern ("Капитан Керн" 1915, completed in 1927, BF) – renamed Rykov ("Рыков") in 1922, transferred to the Northern Fleet in 1933, renamed Valerian Kyibyshev ("Валериан Куйбышев") in 1937, converted to a target and test vessel in 1955, BU in 1958
 Konstantin ("Константин", 1915, BF) – struck a mine in 1919
 Vladimir ("Владимир", 1915, BF) – renamed Svoboda ("Свобода") 1917, struck a mine in 1919
 Kapitan Konon Zotov ("Капитан Конон Зотов", 1915, BF) – BU without being completed in 1922
 Kapitan Crown ("Капитан Кроун", 1916, BF) – BU without being completed in 1922
 Leitenant Dubasov ("Лейтенант Дубасов", 1916, BF) – BU without being completed in 1924
 Mikhail ("Михаил", 1916, BF) – BU without being completed in 1922
 Sokol (1917, BF) – BU without being completed in 1922
 Mecheslav ("Мечеслав"), ex-Leitenant Lombard ("Лейтенант Ломбард") (1917, BF) – BU without being completed in 1922

  (1,390 tons), 5 ships
 Izyaslav ("Изяслав"), ex-Gormonosets ("Громоносец") (1914, BF) – renamed Karl Marx ("Карл Маркс") 1922, sunk by German aircraft in 1941
 Avtroil ("Автроил", 1914, BF) – captured by the British in 1918 by Tallinn and under the name Lennuk she was delivered to the Estonian Navy. She was sold to Peru in 1933, named  and BU in 1948
 Pryamislav ("Прямислав", 1915, completed 1927, BF) – renamed Kalinin ("Калинин") 1925, struck a mine in 1941
 Bryachislav ("Брячислав", 1914, BF) – wrecked in 1923, BU in 1924
 Fiodor Stratilat ("Фёдор Стратилат", 1917, BF) – BU without being completed in 1924
  (1,320–1,760 tons), 7 ships
  ("Гаджибей", 1916, BSF) – scuttled at Tsemes Bay on 18 June 1918
  ("Фидониси", 1916, BSF) – scuttled at Tsemes Bay on 18 June 1918
  ("Керчь", 1916, BSF) – scuttled at Tsemes Bay on 19 June 1918.
 Kaliakriya ("Калиакрия", 1916, BSF) – scuttled at Tsemes Bay on 18 June 1918. Raised in 1925 and renamed Dzerzhinsky ("Дзержинский"), struck a mine in 1942
 Zante ("Занте", 1917, completed 1923, BSF) – renamed Nezamozhnyi ("Незаможный") in 1923 and Nezamozhnik ("Незможник") in 1926, became a training ship in 1945, was rebuilt as a target vessel in 1949
 Korfu ("Корфу", 1917, completed 1925, BSF) – renamed Petrovskiy ("Петровский") in 1925 and Zhelezniakov ("Железняков") in 1939; she served in the Bulgarian Navy from 1947 to 1949; she was hulked as a floating barracks in 1953 and BU in 1957
 Levkas ("Левкас", 1917, completed 1925, BSF) – renamed Shaumian ("Шаумян") in 1925 and wrecked in 1942
  ("Цериго", 1917, BSF) – transferred incomplete by the White Army to Bizerte, interned by France, sold for BU in 1923
 Gogland/Novik-subclass destroyers, later — Mod. Gogland-class squadron minesweepers (1,350 tons), 4 ships
 Gogland ("Гогланд", BF) – BU without being completed in 1922
 Kulm ("Кульм", BF) – BU without being completed in 1922
 Grengamn ("Гренгамн", BF) – BU without being completed in 1922
 Patras ("Патрас", BF) – BU without being completed in 1922

Footnotes

 References 
 
 Boyevye korabli russkogo flota 8.1914–10.1918 gody: Spravochnik / Red. Yu. V. Apalkov. – INTEK, St. Petersburg, 1996. (Warships of the Russian Navy in August 1914 – October 1918).
 Burov, B. N. Otechestvennoye voyennoye korablestroyenoye v tretyem stoletii svoyei istorii. – Sudostroyeniye, St. Petersburg, 1995. (Native Naval Shipbuilding in 3rd century of its history [i.e. in the 20th century])
 
 Grant, R. Captain. Before Port Arthur In A Destroyer; The Personal Diary Of A Japanese Naval Officer. John Murray, London, 1907.
 Korabli i vspomogatel'nye suda sovetskogo Voyenno-Morskogo Flota (1917–1927 gody). Spravochnik / Red. S. S. Berezhnoi i dr. – Voyenizdat, Moscow, 1981. (Ships and auxiliary vessels of the Soviet Navy in 1917–1927. Reference-book)
 Lyon, David. The First Destroyers. Chatham Publishing, 1 & 2 Faulkner's Alley, Cowcross St, London, Great Britain, 1996. .
 Moiseev, S. P. Spisok. Korabley Russkogo Parovogo i Bronenosnogo Flota (s 1861 po 1917 god)''. – Voyenizdat, Moscow, 1948. (List of Russian Ships of Steam and Armored Navy (from 1861 to 1917).

Russia
Destroyer